Vanadurga Fort also spelled as Wanadurga Fort lies in Vanadurga village in Shahapur taluk of Yadgir district in Karnataka state, India. Vanadurga Fort was built by Shorapur dynasty. Vanadurga village is west to Shahapur and north to Shorapur.

See also
Yadgir Fort
Shahapur, Karnataka
Bonal Bird Sanctuary
Shorapur
Yadgir
Gulbarga

References

Buildings and structures in Yadgir district
Forts in Karnataka
Tourism in Yadgir district